This is a list of schools in the London Borough of Hackney, England.

In 2002, the borough entered into a ten-year contract with the Learning Trust, an independent collaborative body that organises education for Hackney's 27,000 pupils in over 70 schools, nurseries and play centres. The trust was set up in response to an OFSTED report that identified failings in the then existing system.

State-funded schools

Primary schools

Baden-Powell Primary School
Benthal Primary School
Berger Primary School
Betty Layward Primary School
Burbage Primary School
Colvestone Primary School
Daubeney Primary School
De Beauvoir Primary School
Gainsborough Primary School
Gayhurst Community School
Grasmere Primary School
Grazebrook Primary School
Hackney New Primary School
Halley House School
Harrington Hill Primary School
Holmleigh Primary School
Holy Trinity CE Primary School
Hoxton Garden Primary School
Jubilee Primary School
Kingsmead Primary School
Lauriston School
London Fields Primary School
Lubavitch Girls Primary School
Lubavitch Junior Boys
Mandeville Primary School
Millfields Community School
Morningside Primary School
Mossbourne Parkside Academy
Mossbourne Riverside Academy
Nightingale Primary School
Northwold Primary School
The Olive School Hackney
Orchard Primary School
Our Lady and St Joseph's RC Primary School
Parkwood Primary School
Princess May Primary School
Queensbridge Primary School
Randal Cremer Primary School
Rushmore Primary School
St Dominic's RC Primary School
St John and St James CE Primary School
St John of Jerusalem CE Primary School
St John the Baptist CE Primary School
St Mary's CE Primary School
St Matthias CE Primary School
St Monica's RC Primary School
St Paul's with St Michael's CE Primary School
St Scholastica's RC Primary School
Sebright School
Shacklewell Primary School
Shoreditch Park Primary School
Simon Marks Jewish Primary School
Sir Thomas Abney School
Southwold Primary School
Springfield Community Primary School
Thomas Fairchild Community School
Tyssen Primary School
Shoreditch Park Primary School (former Whitmore Primary School)
William Patten Primary School
Woodberry Down Community Primary School 

Sources

Secondary schools

The Bridge Academy
Cardinal Pole RC School
City Academy, Hackney
City of London Academy, Shoreditch Park
Clapton Girls' Academy
Haggerston School
Lubavitch Senior Girls' School
Mossbourne Community Academy
Mossbourne Victoria Park Academy
Our Lady's RC High School
Petchey Academy
Skinners' Academy
Stoke Newington School
The Urswick School
Waterside Academy
Yesodey Hatorah Senior Girls' School

Sources

Special and alternative schools
The Boxing Academy AP Free School
The Garden School
Ickburgh School
New Regent's College
Stormont House School
Sources

Further education
BSix Sixth Form College
Hackney College
Sources

Independent schools

Primary and preparatory schools

Al-Falah Primary School
Beis Aharon School
Beis Ruchel D'Satmar London
Beis Yaakov Girls School
Bnei Zion Community School
Bobov Primary Boys School
The Lyceum
Ohr Emes
Rosemary Works School
Talmud Torah Chaim Meirim Wiznitz School
Talmud Torah London
Talmud Torah Yetev Lev
TTD Gur School
TTTYY School
Vishnitz Girls School
Wiznitz Cheder School
Yesodey Hatorah Girls School

Senior and all-through schools

Beis Chinuch Lebonos Girls School
Beis Malka Girls' School
Beis Rochel d'Satmar Girls' School
Beis Trana Girls' School
Bnois Jerusalem Girls School
Bnos Zion of Bobov
Talmud Torah Machzikei Hadass School
Tawhid Boys School
Tayyibah Girls' School
Yesodey Hatorah School

Special and alternative schools
Hackney City Farm
Leaways School
Side By Side School

References

External links 
Learning Trust
Hackney Borough Education

 
Hackney